Rarities (1998–2017) is a compilation album by American singer-songwriter Natalie Merchant. Originally released in 2017 as part of the ten-disc box set The Natalie Merchant Collection, it was released to digital platforms and streaming services by Nonesuch Records on June 26, 2020. The album consists of lesser known and previously unreleased songs recorded by Merchant spanning from 1998 to 2017.

Track listing

References

2017 compilation albums
Natalie Merchant albums
Nonesuch Records albums